The Kazakhstan First Division is the second division of football in Kazakhstan. The League is controlled by the Football Union of Kazakhstan and feeds into the Kazakhstan Premier League, having been founded in 1994. It runs from spring and to late autumn, making each championship correspond to a calendar year.

Seasons summary

Notes:

 Current club names shown in table. Historical names could be different.

2021 Member clubs

External links
 Current Table at KFF
 RSSSF page about Kazakhstan First Division

 
2
Second level football leagues in Europe